Mishamandan (also Romanized as Mīshāmandān) is a village in Howmeh Rural District, in the Central District of Rasht County, Gilan Province, Iran. At the 2006 census, its population was 1,174, in 313 families.

References 

Populated places in Rasht County